Oiticica oil is a light-yellowish oil obtained from the seeds of oiticica tree (Licania rigida) which grows mainly in Brasil.

Extraction and appearance 
Oiticica oil is generally obtained from the kernels by crushing, pressing and expelling at high temperatures (210-220 °C) to prevent its polymerization. The raw oil is yellowish, turning brown after oxidation. It has also an unpleasant smell and taste, which limits its use in food and cosmetics applications.

Usage 

Oiticica oil is used in industrial oil paints and varnishes as a substitute for tung oil, either alone or mixed with linseed oil and sesame oil to achieve even better results.

Composition 
The fat components of oiticica oil are polyunsaturated α-licanic acid (46 – 78% of total), saturated fat mainly palmitic and stearic acids (together, 11%), monounsaturated as oleic acid (4 – 12%).

References 

Waxes
Vegetable oils
Cosmetics chemicals